Zacharias Topelius  (14 January 181812 March 1898) was a Finnish author, poet, journalist, historian, and rector of the University of Helsinki who wrote novels related to Finnish history.

Given name
Zacharias is his baptismal name, and this is used on the covers of his printed works. However, "he himself most often used the abbreviation Z. or the form Zachris, even in official contexts", as explained in the National Biography of Finland. Zachris is therefore the preferred form used in recent academic literature about him.

Other spellings used are Sakari and Sakarias.

Life and career

Early life

The original name of the Topelius family was the Finnish name Toppila, which had been Latinized to Toppelius by the author's grandfather's grandfather and later changed to Topelius. Topelius was born at Kuddnäs, near Nykarleby in Ostrobothnia, the son of a physician of the same name, who was distinguished as the earliest collector of Finnish folk-songs. As a child he heard his mother, Katarina Sofia Calamnius, sing the songs of the Finnish-Swedish poet Franzén. At the age of eleven, he was sent to school in Oulu and boarded with relatives in the possession of a lending library, where he nurtured his fantasy with the reading of novels. He was also given a Christian upbringing that came to characterize his entire life.

Study in Helsinki

He came to Helsingfors, Helsinki in 1831 and became a member of the circle of young nationalist men surrounding Johan Ludvig Runeberg, in whose home he stayed for some time. Topelius became a student at the Imperial Alexander University of Finland in 1833, received his master's degree (cand. philol.) in 1840, the Licentiate degree in history in 1844 and his PhD in 1847, having defended a dissertation titled De modo matrimonia jungendi apud fennos quondam vigente ("About the custom of marriage among the ancient Finns"). Besides history, his academic studies had for periods been devoted both to Theology and Medicine. He was secretary of  1842–1846, was employed by the university library 1846–1861, and taught History, Statistics and Swedish at the school  during the same period.

Becoming a professor
Through the intervention of a friend, Topelius was named professor extraordinary of the History of Finland at the university in 1854. He was made first ordinary professor of Finnish, Russian and Nordic history in 1863, and exchanged this chair for the one in general history in 1876. He was rector of the university from 1875 until 1878, when he retired as Emeritus Professor and received the title of verkligt statsråd (Finnish: todellinen valtioneuvos, Russian: действительный статский советник; literally "state councillor", a Russian honorary title).

Focus on writing

Quite early in his career he began to distinguish himself as a lyric poet, with the three successive volumes of his Heather Blossoms (1845–54). The earliest of his historical romances was The Duchess of Finland, published in 1850. In 1878, Topelius was allowed to withdraw from his professional duties, but this did not sever his connection with the university; it gave him, however, more leisure for his abundant and various literary enterprises. Of all the multifarious writings of Topelius, in prose and verse, that which has enjoyed the greatest popularity is his Tales of a Barber-Surgeon, episodes of historical fiction from the days of Gustavus II. Adolphus to those of Gustavus III., treated in the manner of Sir Walter Scott; the five volumes of this work appeared between 1853 and 1867. Topelius attempted to write drama, too, enjoying most success with his tragedy Regina von Emmeritz (1854). Topelius aimed at the cultivation of a strong Finnish patriotism. He wrote a poem which Jean Sibelius used for a composition with a political statement, Islossningen i Uleå älv.

Together with the composer Friedrich Pacius, he wrote the libretto (in the style of Romantic nationalism) to the first Finnish opera: Kaarle-kuninkaan metsästys (Kung Karls jakt). Topelius initially thought of writing a trivial entertainment, but having heard extracts from the opera project at a concert in 1851, he realized that Pacius was writing a grand opera on the theme of salvation, following the early Romantic style of Carl Maria von Weber's Der Freischütz (1821) and Oberon (1826). Topelius wrote the libretto in Swedish (though it was translated later by others), but its subject is emphatically Finnish. He also wrote the libretto for Prinsessan av Cypern, set by Fredrik Pacius and Lars-Erik Larsson.

Death

Topelius died in his manor house in Koivuniemi, Sipoo, Finland, where he wrote his greatest works. He is buried in the Hietaniemi Cemetery in Helsinki.

Legacy
According to tradition, the modern flag of Finland was based on a design by Topelius in about 1860.

There was a small Finnish American village named after Topelius, platted in 1901 in Otter Tail County, Minnesota, US.

Selected works
 The Tomten in Åbo Castle, 1849
 Sov du lilla vide ung, 1869 (Trollsländan)
 Boken om vårt land, 1875 (Maamme-kirja, Book of Our Land)
 Vinterqvällar, 1881 (Talvi-iltain tarinoita)
 Fältskärns berättelser, 1884 (Välskärin kertomukset)
 Läsning för barn, 1881 (Lukemisia lapsille)
 Stjärnornas kungabarn, 1899–1900 (Tähtien turvatit)
Sampo Lappelill (1860)

Gallery

References

Further reading

External links 

 Zachris Topelius at the Lied and Art Song Archive
 Zachris Topelius at the Biographical Centre of the Finnish Literature Society
 Zacharias Topelius at 375 Humanists, University of Helsinki, Faculty of Arts. 20 June 2015.
 The childhood home of Zachris Topelius, Kuddnäs, Museum
Swedish language pages
 Zacharias Topelius skrifter
 Topelius i Nordisk familjebok
 Nordisk familjebok, vol. 29, col. 352ff
 
Books in Swedish, Finnish and English
 Works by Zacharias Topelius at Project Runeberg 
 
 
 
Lyrics
 En liten fågel
 Du är min ro
Audio
 En liten fågel on Victor Records
 Du är min ro on Edison Records

1818 births
1898 deaths
People from Nykarleby
People from Vaasa Province (Grand Duchy of Finland)
19th-century Finnish historians
Finnish poets in Swedish
Finnish writers in Swedish
Writers from Ostrobothnia (region)
19th-century Finnish poets
Finnish male poets
Burials at Hietaniemi Cemetery
19th-century male writers
Opera librettists
Rectors of the University of Helsinki